Henry "Harry" McNeil (1850 – 2 June 1924) was a Scottish footballer.

During his career, McNeil played in several positions for Queen's Park (where he won five Scottish Cups) and Third Lanark, as well as the Scottish national team.

McNeil was football's caps world record holder from March 1881 (taking the title from clubmate Billy MacKinnon) until March 1882 when John Price of Wales earned his 11th cap.

He later managed a sports shop in central Glasgow with his brother Peter, ran a hotel in Bangor, County Down with his brother Moses,  operated a public house in Rutherglen and worked as a travelling salesman.

His brothers Moses and Peter McNeil were also footballers, who were among the founders of Rangers F.C.; Henry contributed to some of Rangers' first matches in 1872 as a guest player and Moses and Henry McNeil played together for Scotland. Another sibling, William, also played for Rangers.

International goals 

Scores and results list Scotland's goal tally first.

Notes

References

External links

1850 births
1924 deaths
Scottish footballers
Queen's Park F.C. players
Scotland international footballers
Third Lanark A.C. players
People from Rhu, Argyll and Bute
Association football wingers
Association football inside forwards
Association football wing halves
Sportspeople from Argyll and Bute
Rangers F.C. players